The qualification competition for the 1990 FIFA World Cup was a series of tournaments organised by the six FIFA confederations. Each confederation — the Asian Football Confederation (AFC), Confederation of African Football (CAF), CONCACAF (North America), CONMEBOL (South America), Oceania Football Confederation (OFC), and UEFA (Europe) — was allocated a certain number of the 24 places at the tournament. A total of 116 teams entered the competition, with Italy, as the host, and Argentina, as the holders, qualifying for the final tournament automatically.

The first qualification match was played on 17 April 1988 and qualification concluded on 19 November 1989. A total of 735 goals were scored in the 314 qualifying matches (an average of 2.34 per match).

Entrants
At the close of entries on 30 September 1987, a total of 116 football associations had entered the 1990 World Cup. This entry figure was five lower than those who originally entered the previous tournament, a then-World Cup record of 121 entries.

Three entries were rejected by FIFA: Belize, Mauritius and Mozambique due to their outstanding financial debts, taking the number of accepted teams down to 113. With both the hosts and holders qualifying automatically for the finals, 111 nations were therefore scheduled to compete in the qualifying competitions. Gabon, Oman and Pakistan were making their first appearance in the World Cup.

Seven teams withdrew during the qualifying process without playing a match: Bahrain, India, Lesotho, Maldives, Rwanda, South Yemen and Togo. Mexico were disqualified from the CONCACAF qualifying tournament before playing a game for fielding overage players in the qualifying stages for the 1988 Olympic Games. Libya withdrew during the CAF group stage, but had already (successfully) played in the first round. Therefore, the total number of teams playing at least one fixture during the 1990 World Cup competition was 105 (103 during qualifying).

Confederation qualification

AFC

First round, the 22 teams are divided into 6 groups, 4 groups of 4 teams and 2 groups of 3 teams. the winners advance to the final round. Final round, the 6 teams played each other once, the winner and runner up qualify

Korea Republic and  United Arab Emirates qualified.

CAF

Rwanda and Togo both withdrew. The remaining teams played playoff games on a home and away basis. The Winners advance to the group stage. Group stage, the 16 teams are divided into 4 groups of 4 teams. The winners advance to the final round. Final round, the 4 teams play playoff games on a home and away basis, the winners would qualify.

Egypt and Cameroon qualified.

CONCACAF

First round, the 10 teams played playoff games each other in a home and away basis the winners advice to the second round. In the second round, Mexico, who had a bye, were disqualified, allowing Costa Rica to proceed by walkover; the remaining 8 teams played playoff games each other on a home and away basis, the winners advance to the final round, Final round, the 5 teams played each other on a home and away basis, the winner and runner up qualify.

Costa Rica and United States qualified.

CONMEBOL

The 9 teams are divided into 3 groups of 3 teams

Group 1 - Uruguay qualified.
Group 2 - Colombia advanced to the Intercontinental Play-off.
Group 3 - Brazil qualified.

OFC

The 4 teams are divided into 2 groups of 2 teams. The winners advance to the final round. Final round, the 3 teams played each other twice. The winner advanced to an intercontinental playoff against a CONMEBOL member.

Israel advanced to the Intercontinental Play-off.

UEFA

The 32 teams are divided into 7 groups, 4 groups of 5 teams and 3 groups of 4 teams each.

Group 1 - Romania qualified.
Group 2 - Sweden and England qualified.
Group 3 - Soviet Union and Austria qualified.
Group 4 - Netherlands and West Germany qualified.
Group 5 - Yugoslavia and Scotland qualified.
Group 6 - Spain and Republic of Ireland qualified.
Group 7 - Belgium and Czechoslovakia qualified.

Inter-confederation play-offs: CONMEBOL v OFC

The winning team of the OFC qualification tournament played the CONMEBOL group winner with the weakest record in a home-and-away play-off. The winner of this play-off qualified for the 1990 FIFA World Cup.

Qualified teams

The following 24 teams qualified for the 1990 FIFA World Cup:

Top goalscorers

7 goals
 Marc Van Der Linden
 Hwang Sun-Hong

6 goals
 Ma Lin
 Mo Johnston
 Ahmed Radhi 
 Mahmoud Yaseen Al-Soufi

Notes
 On 12 August 1989, Samuel Okwaraji collapsed and died whilst playing for Nigeria in their qualifying match against Angola, ten minutes before the end.
 One of the most bizarre incidents in World Cup history occurred on 3 September 1989. During the Brazil vs Chile CONMEBOL qualifying match in Rio de Janeiro, Chile needed victory to retain any hope of qualification, but trailed 0–1 to Brazil. Around twenty minutes into the second half, Chilean goalkeeper Roberto "Cóndor" Rojas fell to the pitch with an apparent injury to his forehead. A firework, thrown from the stands by a Brazilian fan named Rosenery Mello do Nascimento, was smouldering about some yards away. After carrying Rojas off the pitch, the Chilean players and coaches refused to return claiming conditions were not safe, and the match went unfinished. After studying video footage of the match showing that the firework had not made any contact with Rojas, FIFA awarded Brazil a 2–0 win, eliminating Chile from the 1990 World Cup. As punishment, Chile were barred from the qualifying process for the 1994 FIFA World Cup, and Roberto Rojas was banned for life (subsequently lifted in 2001) for his role in falsifying the story simulating an attack by the Brazilian fans. The incident is called the Maracanazo by the Chile national team since it took place in the Maracanã Stadium.
 The decisive second leg of the CAF Final Round, tie between Egypt and Algeria in Cairo saw ugly scenes at its conclusion. The game was won 1–0 by Egypt, sending them to the 1990 World Cup at the expense of their opponent. After the final whistle, Algerian players and officials mobbed the referee and threw plant pots into the crowd. At the post-game conference, the Egyptian team doctor was blinded in one eye after being hit with a broken bottle thrown by an Algerian player. This was believed to be star striker Lakhdar Belloumi who was sentenced to prison for this offense, but he denied any wrongdoing and a twenty-year international arrest warrant was eventually quashed in 2009. Teammates had previously testified that reserve goalkeeper Kamel Kadri was instead the culprit.

References

External links
1990 FIFA World Cup Preliminaries at FIFA.com

 
Qualification
FIFA World Cup qualification